Martin Vengesayi (born 18 November 1987) is a Zimbabwean football midfielder who currently plays for Harare City.

References

1987 births
Living people
Zimbabwean footballers
Masvingo United F.C. players
Monomotapa United F.C. players
Kiglon F.C. players
Dynamos F.C. players
Harare City F.C. players
Zimbabwe international footballers
Association football midfielders